The Cabinet of Friis  was the government of Denmark from 5 April 1920 to 5 May 1920. It was created during the Easter Crisis of 1920 and after the Cabinet of Liebe, as a compromise until elections could be held later that year.

List of ministers
The cabinet consisted of these ministers:

References

1920 establishments in Denmark
1920 disestablishments in Denmark
Friis